Nannophya fenshami is a species of dragonfly of the family Libellulidae, 
known as the artesian pygmyfly.
It is a very small dragonfly with a wingspan less than 30mm, that has been found living in an artesian spring wetland of the Barcaldine region of Central Queensland, Australia. Males are dark in colour and covered in a pale pruinescence with a red tip to their tail, while females are black with a distinctive yellow pattern.

Etymology
Nannophya fenshami is named after Rod Fensham, a specialist in artesian spring wetlands.

See also
 List of Odonata species of Australia

References

Libellulidae
Odonata of Australia
Endemic fauna of Australia
Taxa named by Günther Theischinger
Insects described in 2020